"Riot" is a song by Welsh heavy metal band Bullet for My Valentine. The single "Riot" is included on their fourth studio album Temper Temper. It charted at number 22 on Mainstream Rock Songs. It was featured in the video game NHL 14.

Personnel
 Matthew Tuck - lead vocals, rhythm guitar
 Michael "Padge" Paget – lead guitar, backing vocals
 Michael "Moose" Thomas – drums, percussion
 Jason James – bass guitar, backing vocals

References

Bullet for My Valentine songs
2012 songs
RCA Records singles
Songs written by Matthew Tuck
Songs written by Michael Paget
Songs written by Jason James (musician)